Matthew Charles Turner (born June 24, 1994) is an American professional soccer player who plays as a goalkeeper for  club Arsenal and the United States national team.

Early career
A native of Park Ridge, New Jersey, Turner attended Saint Joseph Regional High School. Turner didn't play soccer until he was 14 years old, initially taking up the sport to stay in shape for his primary sports of basketball and baseball. He started playing in goal when the only other goalkeeper for his freshman team was injured at tryouts.

Turner spent his entire collegiate career at Fairfield University. He made a total of 39 appearances for the Stags and finished with 21 shutouts. He was named to the All-Metro Atlantic Athletic Conference second team during his senior season.

He also played in the Premier Development League for Jersey Express, leading the team to the PDL national semifinals in 2014.

Club career

New England Revolution
Turner was not selected in the 2016 MLS SuperDraft, but he signed a professional contract with Major League Soccer (MLS) club New England Revolution on March 3, 2016, after a successful preseason trial.

2016–17 seasons

On April 29, he joined United Soccer League club Richmond Kickers on loan and made his professional debut a day later in a 1–0 victory over Toronto FC II. During his two loan stints with the Kickers, Turner recorded 7 clean sheets in 27 starts.

2018 season
Turner earned the starting job for the Revolution entering the 2018 season, beating out Brad Knighton and Cody Cropper for the job. He made his MLS debut on March 3, 2018, in the Revolution's season opener against Philadelphia Union, making four saves in a 2–0 loss. Turner started all four of New England's matches to open the season, recording a 1.25 goals against average and 16 saves throughout that period. On March 31, 2018, he made six saves and recorded his first MLS clean sheet in the club's 2–0 win at BBVA Compass Stadium against Houston Dynamo FC. It was the first clean sheet a Revolution keeper had recorded since August 24, 2016. He recorded four more clean sheets over the 2018 season.

2019 season
After a difficult start to the 2019 season which saw Turner drop to third string behind Cropper and Knighton, he re-emerged as the starter for the club, ultimately starting 20 matches and recording five clean sheets. Turner would lead the Revolution to its first playoff match since 2015. It was also Turner's first playoff match. He started in the Revolution's 1–0 away loss to Atlanta United FC in the first round of the 2019 MLS Cup Playoffs. Turner finished as an MLS goalkeeper of the year finalist, ranking 5th in voting behind winner Vito Mannone, D.C. United's Bill Hamid, New York City FC's Sean Johnson, and Atlanta's Brad Guzan.

2020 season
Turner had a stand-out season in 2020 and was subsequently named as a finalist for the MLS Goalkeeper of the Year Award. Over the course of the season, Turner started 22 of the team's 23 matches, recording an 8–7–8 record, setting a new club record for goals against per game (1.08), recording six shut-outs, and leading his team to a second consecutive trip to the MLS Cup Playoffs. At the conclusion of the season, Turner ranked second in Revs history in saves percentage and goals against average (1.36). He additionally finished as the leader ranked among the top-10 MLS goalkeepers in saves percentage, goals against average, and saves. His save percentage was the highest of any MLS keeper since the start of the 2019 season. He ultimately finished the season second in voting for the MLS goalkeeper of the year, behind Andre Blake.

In round one of the 2020 MLS Cup Playoffs, Turner recorded a clean sheet against the Supporters' Shield-holding Philadelphia Union in the Revolution's 2–0 win. Turner then saved a Nani penalty kick in the Revolution's Eastern Conference semifinal 3–1 victory over Orlando City SC.

In 2020, New England Revolution fans voted Turner the Revolution team MVP, his teammates voted him the Revolution Player of the Year, and Revolution supporters group the Midnight Riders voted him the Midnight Riders Man of the Year.

2021 season
Turner continued to play well over the course of the 2021 season, recording a 1.25 goals-against average, a 73.2 save percentage, and five shutouts over 28 starts. He was named the 2021 MLS Goalkeeper of the Year. He was the first keeper in Revolution history to earn the honor. During the 2021 season, Turner was named 2021 MLS All-Star Game MVP after making two penalty saves against the Liga MX All stars on August 25, 2021. He also set a club record with 17 regular season wins, which was tied for the most in the league.

Arsenal
On February 11, 2022, it was announced that Turner and Premier League club Arsenal had agreed to a deal that would see him move to the London club in the summer of 2022. He was Arsenal's first summer signing of the window. Arsenal reportedly paid a transfer fee of $6 million that could potentially rise to $10 million. On June 27, 2022, Arsenal announced Turner as the new player on a long-term contract. Turner was given the number 30 shirt.

Turner started Arsenal's July 8, 2022, friendly at 1. FC Nürnberg. Arsenal won the match 5–3.

On September 8, 2022, Turner started against FC Zürich during the 2022–23 UEFA Europa League group stage, which Arsenal won 2–1. On October 6, Turner recorded his first clean sheet for the club in a 3–0 win against Bodø/Glimt at the Emirates in the subsequent Europa League fixture. Following this, Turner recorded back-to-back clean sheets in further Europa League wins against Bodø/Glimt again and PSV Eindhoven. The former of the two performances, a 1–0 away win at the Aspmyra Stadion on October 13, drew praise from Arsenal manager Mikel Arteta.

International career

Turner made his international debut on January 31, 2021, for the United States men's national team, starting in goal against Trinidad and Tobago in a friendly match. Turner recorded a clean sheet, saving a penalty kick from Alvin Jones.

Turner started in all six games for the United States in the 2021 CONCACAF Gold Cup. He recorded five clean sheets, including one in a 1–0 win against Mexico in the final. For his performance, Turner was awarded "Best Goalkeeper" of the tournament.

In November 2022, Turner was selected for the USMNT squad that competed in the 2022 FIFA World Cup in Qatar, where he played as the primary goalkeeper and was one of three players to feature in all 360 minutes of the tournament for the American squad. Turner kept two clean sheets in the tournament, becoming the first US goalkeeper to record multiple clean sheets in one edition of the FIFA World Cup since 1930.

Personal life
Turner is Jewish. Turner and his father both obtained Lithuanian passports in 2020; Turner's paternal great-grandmother fled from religious persecution during World War II, and as Jews emigrated from Lithuania. His father's family is Jewish, and they Anglicized their surname from "Turnovski" to ″Turner″ at Ellis Island when immigrating, whereas his mother's family is Catholic.

He married ex-NFL cheerleader Ashley Herron in 2022. Their son Easton was born on June 29, 2022.

Career statistics

Club

International

Honors
United States
CONCACAF Gold Cup: 2021

New England Revolution
Supporters' Shield: 2021

Individual
CONCACAF Gold Cup Golden Glove Award: 2021
CONCACAF Gold Cup Best XI: 2021
MLS All-Star: 2021
MLS All-Star Game MVP: 2021
MLS Goalkeeper of the Year: 2021
MLS Best XI: 2021

See also
List of Jewish footballers
List of Jews in sports

References

External links

Profile at the Arsenal F.C. website
Profile at the Premier League website
 Fairfield profile
 New England profile
 U.S. Soccer profile
 
 

1994 births
Living people
American people of Lithuanian-Jewish descent
Ashkenazi Jews
American soccer players
Jewish American sportspeople
Jewish footballers
Soccer players from New Jersey
Sportspeople from Bergen County, New Jersey
People from Park Ridge, New Jersey
Association football goalkeepers
Saint Joseph Regional High School alumni
Fairfield Stags men's soccer players
Fairfield University alumni
Jersey Express S.C. players
New England Revolution players
Richmond Kickers players
Arsenal F.C. players
Major League Soccer players
USL Championship players
USL League Two players
2021 CONCACAF Gold Cup players
2022 FIFA World Cup players
United States men's international soccer players
CONCACAF Gold Cup-winning players
Undrafted Major League Soccer players
American expatriate sportspeople in England